The 1946–47 Boston Celtics season was the first season of the Boston Celtics in the Basketball Association of America (BAA/NBA). Walter A. Brown was the man who was responsible for starting the franchise. In June 1946, Brown, who operated the Boston Garden arena and was part of the National Hockey League's Boston Bruins, was the driving force behind the Basketball Association of America and the Celtics birth. After considering several team names, including Whirlwinds, Unicorns and Olympics, Brown opted for Celtics. He hoped to grab the attention of Boston's large Irish American population. John Davis "Honey" Russell was hired as the first Celtics coach, and the team soon began its inaugural season, losing its first game 59–53 to the Providence Steamrollers. The Celtics won their first game of the season against the Toronto Huskies on November 16, 1946.

Roster

Regular season
On November 5, the Celtics played their first game at the Boston Garden in front of 4,329 fans. The game would be delayed an hour when the wooden backboard was damaged after a practice dunk during warm-ups. After the backboard was repaired, the Celtics lost to the Chicago Stags by a score 57–55. This would become the first ever broken backboard in BAA/NBA History.

Season standings

Record vs. opponents

Game log

|- align="center" bgcolor="edbebf"
| 1 || November 2, 1946 || @ Providence Steamrollers || 53–59 || Rhode Island Auditorium || Red Wallace (9) || 0–1
|- align="center" bgcolor="edbebf"
| 2 || November 5, 1946 || Chicago Stags || 55–57 || Boston Garden || John Simmons (13) || 0–2
|- align="center" bgcolor="edbebf"
| 3 || November 9|| @ Detroit Falcons || 46–69 || UNK || Art Spector (12) || 0–3
|- align="center" bgcolor="edbebf"
| 4 || November 13 || @ Chicago Stags || 61–71 || Chicago Stadium || John Simmons (14) || 0–4
|- align="center" bgcolor="edbebf"
| 5 || November 14|| @ St. Louis Bombers || 62–64 || St. Louis Arena || Gray, Wallace (12) || 0–5
|- align="center" bgcolor="#bbffbb"
| 6 || November 16 || Toronto Huskies || 53–49 || Boston Garden || Wyndol Gray (13) || 1–5
|- align="center" bgcolor="edbebf"
| 7 || November 21 || St. Louis Bombers || 53–65 || Boston Garden || Connie Simmons (9) || 1–6
|- align="center" bgcolor="edbebf"
| 8 || November 22 || @ Toronto Huskies || 82–83 || Maple Leaf Gardens || Connie Simmons (18) || 1–7
|- align="center" bgcolor="edbebf"
| 9 || November 23 || @ Detroit Falcons || 46–54 || UNK || Connie Simmons (15) || 1–8
|- align="center" bgcolor="edbebf"
| 10 || November 25|| Providence Steam Rollers || 59–71 || Boston Garden || John Simmons (14) || 1–9
|- align="center" bgcolor="edbebf"
| 11 || November 26 || Philadelphia Warriors || 54–66 || Philadelphia Arena || Connie Simmons (15) || 1–10
|- align="center" bgcolor="#bbffbb"
| 12 || November 28|| Pittsburgh Ironmen || 59–55 || Boston Garden || Harold Kottman (19) || 2–10
|-

|- align="center" bgcolor="edbebf"
| 13 || December 1|| @ Chicago Stags || 56–66 || Boston Garden || Al Brightman (26) || 2–11
|- align="center" bgcolor="#bbffbb"
| 14 || December 2|| @ Pittsburgh Ironmen || 46–44 || Duquesne Gardens || Al Brightman (11) || 3–11
|- align="center" bgcolor="edbebf"
| 15 || December 5|| Detroit Falcons || 61–65 || Boston Garden || Connie Simmons (10) || 3–12
|- align="center" bgcolor="edbebf"
| 16 || December 7|| New York Knickerbockers || 65–90 || Boston Garden || Gray, Kottman (15) || 3–13
|- align="center" bgcolor="edbebf"
| 17 || December 8|| @ New York Knickerbockers || 44–62 || Madison Square Garden || Wyndol Gray (13) || 3–14
|- align="center" bgcolor="#bbffbb"
| 18 || December 12|| Detroit Falcons || 73–66 || Boston Garden || Jerry Kelly (21) || 4–14
|- align="center" bgcolor="#bbffbb"
| 19 || December 14|| Philadelphia Warriors || 77–65 || Boston Garden || Red Wallace (19) || 5–14
|- align="center" bgcolor="edbebf"
| 20 || December 19|| St. Louis Bombers || 74–76 || Boston Garden || Al Brightman (13) || 5–15
|- align="center" bgcolor="edbebf"
| 21 || December 22|| @ St. Louis Bombers || 53–65 || St. Louis Arena || Chuck Connors (14) || 5–16
|- align="center" bgcolor="edbebf"
| 22 || December 23|| @ Pittsburgh Ironmen || 54–64 || Duquesne Gardens || C. Simmons, Spector (9) || 5–17
|- align="center" bgcolor="edbebf"
| 23 || December 27|| Philadelphia Warriors || 60–63 || Boston Garden || Al Brightman (17) || 5–18
|- align="center" bgcolor="edbebf"
| 24 || December 28|| @ Providence Steam Rollers || 68–80 || Rhode Island Auditorium || Wyndol Gray (17) || 5–19
|- align="center" bgcolor="edbebf"
| 25 || December 30|| Washington Capitols || 60–70 || Boston Garden || Connie Simmons (19) || 5–20
|-

|- align="center" bgcolor="#bbffbb"
| 26 || January 3|| @ Toronto Huskies || 58–53 || Maple Leaf Gardens || Al Brightman (21) || 6–20
|- align="center" bgcolor="edbebf"
| 27 || January 6|| Cleveland Rebels || 53–64 || Boston Garden || Connors, Gray (15) || 6–21
|- align="center" bgcolor="#bbffbb"
| 28 || January 10|| New York Knicks || 66–62 || Boston Garden || Al Brightman (18) || 7–21
|- align="center" bgcolor="#bbffbb"
| 29 || January 11|| @ Providence Steam Rollers || 73–72 || Rhode Island Auditorium || Al Brightman (17) || 8–21
|- align="center" bgcolor="#bbffbb"
| 30 || January 16|| Washington Capitols || 47–38 || Boston Garden || Al Brightman (14) || 9–21
|- align="center" bgcolor="#bbffbb"
| 31 || January 18|| @ New York Knickerbockers || 58–45 || Madison Square Garden || Al Brightman (19) || 10–21
|- align="center" bgcolor="edbebf"
| 32 || January 20|| Chicago Stags || 54–81 || Boston Garden || Wyndol Gray (13) || 10–22
|- align="center" bgcolor="edbebf"
| 33 || January 21|| @ Philadelphia Warriors || 43–59 || Philadelphia Arena || John Simmons (10) || 10−23
|- align="center" bgcolor="#bbffbb"
| 34 || January 23|| Pittsburgh Ironmen || 48–43 || Boston Garden || Charlie Hoefer (11) || 11–23
|- align="center" bgcolor="bbffbb"
| 35 || January 25|| @ New York Knickerbockers || 52–46 || Madison Square Garden || Al Brightman (17) || 11–24
|- align="center" bgcolor="edbebf"
| 36 || January 27|| Washington Capitols || 57–80 || Boston Garden || Connie Simmons (12) || 12–24
|- align="center" bgcolor="edbebf"
| 37 || January 29|| @ Washington Capitols || 57–69 || Uline Arena || Connie Simmons (11) || 12–25
|- align="center" bgcolor="#bbffbb"
| 38 || January 30|| Pittsburgh Ironmen || 66–51 || Boston Garden || Connie Simmons (18) || 13–25
|-

|- align="center" bgcolor="edbebf"
| 39 || February 3|| @ Philadelphia Warriors || 55–61 || Philadelphia Arena || Connie Simmons (17) || 13–26
|- align="center" bgcolor="bbffbb"
| 40 || February 6|| New York Knickerbockers || 49–48 || Boston Garden || Connie Simmons (14) || 14–26
|- align="center" bgcolor="#bbffbb"
| 41 || February 13|| St. Louis Bombers || 64–54 || Boston Garden || Connie Simmons (17) || 15–26
|- align="center" bgcolor="edbebf"
| 42 || February 16|| @ Chicago Stags || 77–84 || Chicago Stadium || Connie Simmons (25) || 15–27
|- align="center" bgcolor="edbebf"
| 43 || February 18|| @ Cleveland Rebels || 73–84 || Cleveland Arena || Connie Simmons (21) || 15–28
|- align="center" bgcolor="#bbffbb"
| 44 || February 19|| @ Detroit Falcons || 57–51 || UNK || Connie Simmons (18) || 16–28
|- align="center" bgcolor="edbebf"
| 45 || February 21|| @ Toronto Huskies || 61–67 || Maple Leaf Gardens || Connie Simmons (26) || 16–29
|- align="center" bgcolor="edbebf"
| 46 || February 23|| Providence Steam Rollers || 55–67 || Boston Garden || Al Brightman (14) || 16–30
|- align="center" bgcolor="edbebf"
| 47 || February 24|| @ Washington Capitals || 59–83 || Uline Arena || Al Brightman (14) || 16–31
|- align="center" bgcolor="#bbffbb"
| 48 || February 28|| Cleveland Rebels || 69–62 || Boston Garden || Al Brightman (22) || 17–31
|-

|- align="center" bgcolor="edbebf"
| 49 || March 1|| @ Washington Capitols || 52–75 || Uline Arena || Jack Garfinkel (18) || 17–32
|- align="center" bgcolor="#bbffbb"
| 50 || March 6|| Detroit Falcons || 74–65 || Boston Garden || Connie Simmons (19) || 18–32
|- align="center" bgcolor="#bbffbb"
| 50 || March 8|| Toronto Huskies || 67–65 || Boston Garden || Connie Simmons (19) || 19–32
|- align="center" bgcolor="edbebf"
| 52 || March 10|| Providence Steam Rollers || 70–87 || Boston Garden || John Simmons (17) || 19–33
|- align="center" bgcolor="#bbffbb"
| 53 || March 12|| Toronto Huskies || 69–57 || Boston Garden || Hoefer, J. Simmons (13) || 20–33
|- align="center" bgcolor="edbebf"
| 54 || March 13|| @ Philadelphia Warriors || 57–81 || Philadelphia Arena || Charlie Hoefer (12) || 20–34
|- align="center" bgcolor="edbebf"
| 55 || March 18|| Cleveland Rebels || 58–67 || Boston Garden || Connie Simmons (14) || 20–35
|- align="center" bgcolor="edbebf"
| 56 || March 24|| Chicago Stags || 69–80 || Boston Garden || Connie Simmons (17) || 20–36
|- align="center" bgcolor="edbebf"
| 57 || March 25|| @ Cleveland Rebels || 64–72 || Cleveland Arena || Art Spector (19) || 20–37
|- align="center" bgcolor="#bbffbb"
| 58 || March 26|| Pittsburgh Ironmen || 74–61|| Duquesne Gardens || Al Brightman (17) || 21–37
|- align="center" bgcolor="edbebf"
| 59 || March 29|| @ St. Louis Bombers || 55–59 || St. Louis Arena || Al Brightman (15) || 21–38
|- align="center" bgcolor="#bbffbb"
| 60 || March 30|| @ Cleveland Rebels || 71–66 || Cleveland Arena || Connie Simmons (20) || 22–38
|-

|-
| 1946–47 Schedule

Player stats

Season

Transactions

Trades

Purchases

References

Boston Celtics seasons
Boston Celtics
Boston Celtics
Boston Celtics
1940s in Boston